The 1997 Big South Conference men's basketball tournament took place February 26–March 1, 1997, at the Vines Center in Lynchburg, Virginia, the home of the Liberty Flames. For the fourth time in their school history, the Charleston Southern Buccaneers won the tournament, led by head coach Tom Conrad.

The Buccaneers advanced to their first NCAA tournament in school history (the first three times they won the conference tournament, the conference did not have an automatic bid to the NCAA tournament.) As of 2021, this is Charleston Southern's only NCAA tournament appearance.

Format
All eight teams participated in the tournament, hosted at the Vines Center. Teams were seeded by conference winning percentage. This was the last season for UNC Greensboro as a member of the league, who left for the Southern Conference the following season.

Bracket

* Asterisk indicates overtime game
Source

All-Tournament Team
Peter Aluma, Liberty
Rolando Hourruitiner, Charleston Southern
Brett Larrick, Charleston Southern
Larry Jackson, Liberty
Corey Reed, Radford

References

Tournament
Big South Conference men's basketball tournament
ig South Conference men's basketball tournament
Big South Conference men's basketball tournament